A surgical nurse, also referred to as a theatre nurse or scrub nurse, specializes in perioperative care, providing care to patients before, during and after surgery. To become a theatre nurse, Registered Nurses or Enrolled Nurses must complete extra training. Theatre nurses can focus on different speciality areas, depending on which they are interested in.

There are many different phases during surgery where the theatre nurse is needed to support and assist the patient, surgeons, surgical technicians, nurse anaesthetists and nurse practitioners. Pre-operative, the nurse must help to prepare the patient and operating room for the surgery. During the surgery, they assist the anaesthetist and surgeons when they are needed. The last phase is post-operative, ensuring that the patients are provided with suitable care and treatments.

People who want to become surgical nurses attend nursing school and specialize in surgical nursing. They are often required to pass examinations administered by the government or by nursing certification boards before being allowed to work as nurses, and they may also be expected to attend periodic continuing education classes so that they keep up with developments in the nursing field.

In the UK and Australia, surgical patients (those who have undergone a minor or major surgical procedure) are nursed on different wards from medical patients. Nursing practice on surgical wards differs from that of medical wards.

Surgical nurses may practice in different types of surgery:

General surgery (e.g. appendectomy, gallbladder removal)
Vascular surgery (e.g. varicose vein surgery, aortic aneurysm repair)
Colo-rectal surgery (e.g. stoma formation)
Surgical Oncology (e.g. breast surgery, tumour resections)
Orthopaedic surgery (e.g. knee or hip replacements, fracture repair)
Urological surgery (e.g. prostate surgery)
Day surgery (or ambulatory surgery, where a patient is discharged within 24 hours)

Surgical nurses are responsible for approximately six patients, depending on the nature of the surgical ward. Intensive Care and High-Dependency units usually have one to two nurses per patient.

Duties 

Theatre nurses are part of the perioperative surgical team; they work alongside surgeons, surgical technician, nurse anaesthetists and nurse practitioners.

In surgery there are three main phases: preoperative, intraoperative and postoperative. These phases collectively are known as the perioperative period. Each phase is related to specific activities carried out and skills needed for different stages of nursing.

Preoperative Phase
This stage is undertaken when the patient decides to have surgery. It may include discussing with the patients all the benefits of the procedure but also the dangers that could occur. This is an opportunity for the patient to discuss any concerns they may have. Also the theatre nurses must make sure that the patients are in good condition, before going ahead with the surgery. While it is very important to prepare a patient physically, it is also important to mentally prepare a patient prior to surgery. A surgical nurse will help prepare the patient using various methods often including family members depending on the situation. The patient will normally express any concerns about the surgery to the nurse; this information will be passed on to other hospital staff including the surgeon. The appropriate actions will be taken dependent on the situation.

Intraoperative Phase 
This stage begins when the ward nurse, who has prepared the patient for surgery, delivers the patient and their notes to the theatre and/or anaesthetic nurse. Many checks are undertaken at this stage to ensure a safe environment for the patient and the theatre staff. The theatre nurse works to maintain a sterile environment and to ensure the surgical equipment is working well. The nurse also organises all surgical instruments and ensures all supplies needed during the surgery are available.

Postoperative Phase 
This phase begins when the theatre/anaesthetic nurse delivers the patient's notes to the nurses and staff in the Post-Anaesthetic Care Unit (PACU). This can also be known as the recovery room. Here the nurse's immediate attention is on checking the patient's airway and breathing. In this phase nurses also attend to pain relief and any other complications following surgery. These nurses, often in day surgery cases, attend to provide patients and their caregivers with support and instructions and requirements needed for home care.

The first twenty-four hours post surgery are critical, and  many procedures are required to monitor the patient. Observations of the patient need to be taken and recorded every fifteen minutes. General observations include heart rate, blood pressure, temperature, respiratory rate and oxygen saturation. Further post-operative tasks for a surgical nurse include: urine output, assessment of wound sites, replacing intravenous requirements and reporting any abnormalities. To aid recovery, It may be necessary for the nurse to be free of the world

Credentials 

To become a surgical nurse, CCTC one must have undertaken appropriate training, and be registered with the state nursing board (Nursing and Midwifery Council, UK; An Bord Altranais, Rep. of Ireland). In Australia, both Registered Nurses and Enrolled Nurses work in surgical wards. Registered nursing received their training over a longer period of time, as they receive a university degree. To become a registered nurse you must complete a bachelor's degree of nursing which takes up to 3 years. Enrolled Nurses complete a Diploma of Nursing which is a full-time course over 12 –16 months at Technical and Further Education (TAFE).  

In Australia, the education standards are nationwide, requiring an undergraduate nursing degree and graduate diploma in perioperative nursing. The undergraduate degree has a full-time study duration of three years at the University of Notre Dame. The post graduate diploma in preoperative nursing has some prerequisites including; undergraduate nursing degree, be a full-time employee of the Fremantle Health Service, hold a current licence to practice as a level one registered nurse and have at least one year of postgraduate experience. With these qualifications it is possible to become a surgical nurse in Australia.

The Graduate Diploma in Perioperative Nursing is available 1 year full-time or equivalent part-time and is developed to qualify the registered nurse to enhance knowledge and combine skills to work as a specialist within the perioperative field.

Types of surgical nurse 

In the theatre room there are two main types of nurses: a scrub nurse and a circulation nurse. The scrub nurse must make sure they are familiar with and well educated about every piece of operational equipment; as on request they are required to provide the surgeons with the equipment needed. The scrub nurse is also responsible for making sure all operating equipment is accounted for before and after the operation.

The scrub nurse is responsible for many important technical duties. These can include ensuring they have correctly prepared the surgical instruments and trolleys and ensuring that all operating supplies have been sterilised. Non-technical skills are also important for the scrub nurse role. These can include cognitive skills such as formulating appropriate decisions. Another non-technical skill required is being able to work well within a team, for example, the ability to communicate well with the surgical team during a procedure.

A circulation nurse has many similar responsibilities; they should ensure that the operating room is clear and uncontaminated by previous surgeries or other infections. They are also there to collect, open, clear and sterilise packets containing surgical equipment.

Surgical Nurse Interaction with Patients 
It is important for surgical nurses to have a thorough understanding of their roles and interactions with patients and their immediate families within a surgical care environment. One vital role for a surgical nurse is to provide support and confidence to their patient while they are in hospital. Nurses are also required to possess good communication skills and maintain a professional relationship with their patient. It is important for the nurse to build a trusting relationship with their patient but this can prove difficult within the short time available. Due to the fast-paced surgical surroundings, there is little time for surgical nurses to provide information and reassurance before and after surgery. Many patients feel vulnerable and anxious prior to their surgical procedure and it is important for the surgical nurse to recognise their patient's need for psychological support. It is therefore important for the surgical nurse to understand their role in relation to the patient. By understanding the emotional needs of their patients, surgical nurses’ perspectives and conduct towards their patient will influence the patient's experience.

Preoperative Teaching 
Preoperative teaching if delivered competently is an important aspect of patient care. Positive effects of preoperative teaching include a reduction in patients’ anxiety levels, healing time, complications post- surgery, pain relief usage and an increase in satisfied and co-operative patient's in regard to their procedure and treatment. Preoperative teaching is essential to a patient's understanding of the surgical procedure and to help them prepare for postoperative healing.

Preoperative teaching is usually undertaken before the day of surgery. This can be delivered by verbal and/or written instructions. Patients may also have an appointment scheduled with the perioperative nurse to talk over any concerns regarding the procedure. Teaching is further discussed on the day of surgery and also before the patient is discharged to leave the hospital.

Potential Careers 

Nurses who work in the operating theatre become specialists in the field or a specific sub speciality. Once you find a specialist field or specific sub speciality you enjoy working in, the nurse will commence as a junior nurse. After gaining a large amount of knowledge and skills set with experience, if the nurse chooses to become more of an expert in this field, the theatre nurse may do a postgraduate certificate or diploma to become a Clinical Nurse for that speciality. The salary for a surgical nurse in Australia can range from $47,721 to $80,160 with an average of $57,103 this data was recorded in March 2016.

Professional Associations - Perioperative Nursing Associations 
The role of professional associations is to protect, increase and promote common interests of their members. They provide opportunities such as networking, clinical education and research grants. Each Australian State has their own group which form a subdivision of ACORN (Australian College of Perioperative Nurses). Western Australia's group is the Operating Nurses Association of Western Australia (ORNA). Both ACORN and ORNA have a website which provides information about their organisation. These websites are: www.acorn.org.au and ornawa.org

References

Hospital nursing